Zedda is an Italian surname. Notable people with the surname include:

 Alberto Zedda (1928–2017), Italian conductor and musicologist
 Massimo Zedda (born 1976), Italian politician

Italian-language surnames